Guillaume François Colson, a French historical painter, and pupil of David, was born in Paris in 1785, and died there in 1860.

Among
other works, he painted the 'Entry of General Bonaparte into Alexandria,' which is at Versailles.

He also painted various family portraits and scenes of the upper classes in his idle moments, which could be seen as forerunners to artists such as Boudin and the Impressionists who were working decades later.

References

 

1785 births
1850 deaths
19th-century French painters
French male painters
Painters from Paris
Pupils of Jacques-Louis David
18th-century French male artists